Lawrence Flugence (born ) is a former American football linebacker. He was on the roster of the Carolina Panthers as a free agent before being released and subsequently signed by the New England Patriots and ceded to the NFL Europe team the Berlin Thunder.

College

Flugence played linebacker for Texas Tech from 1998 to 2002. While at Texas Tech, Flugence was named Second-team All-Big 12 three times from 2000 to 2002. Additionally, he was named Third-team All-American by the Associated Press for the 2001 season. Flugence lead the Big 12 Conference in tackles from 2000 to 2002 and set the NCAA Division I record for most tackles in a single season with 193 in 2002.

Professional career

Flugence went undrafted following his college career, but signed as a free agent with the Carolina Panthers in 2003. He was released in August of the same year, and subsequently signed with the New England Patriots to be delegated to the Berlin Thunder in 2004. He was released from the Patriots roster in September 2004.

References

1980 births
Living people
Texas Tech Red Raiders football players
American football linebackers
Players of American football from Houston
Carolina Panthers players
Berlin Thunder players
All-American college football players
African-American players of American football
21st-century African-American sportspeople
20th-century African-American people